Craig Paul Kyle (born November 3, 1971) is an American writer for Marvel Comics. He is best known for his creation of the character X-23. He has also produced several of Marvel's direct-to-DVD animated films and worked on several aspects of the Thor film series.

Life and career 
Kyle was born in Houston, Texas. He is a frequent collaborator with Christopher Yost, and they are perhaps best known for the creation of mutant character X-23, teenage female clone of Wolverine. In 2003, Kyle and Yost co-wrote the episodes of X-Men: Evolution that introduced X-23 to the X-Men: Evolution universe. Marvel executives were impressed with X-23's reception on TV, and subsequently asked Yost and Kyle to adapt the character into comics, first by writing the character into a six issue eponymous mini-series, and then by taking over writing chores (as of issue #20) on the New X-Men (formerly New X-Men: Academy X) title, bringing X-23 in as a regular character. The success of X-23's first miniseries (X-23: Innocence Lost) prompted Marvel to order a second six-issue miniseries with Kyle and Yost at the helm, titled X-23: Target X.

Kyle and Yost concluded their stint on the New X-Men title after the events of "X-Men: Messiah Complex" when the title turned into Young X-Men. Chris Yost and Kyle co-wrote the revamped X-Force with Clayton Crain on pencils; the cast featured Wolverine, Warpath, Wolfsbane, and X-23 as black ops agents on assassination missions per the orders of Cyclops. The series ended in 2010 and was replaced by Uncanny X-Force, written by Rick Remender.

Filmography

Film 
Theatrical

Direct-to-video

Television

References

External links 
 

Living people
American comics writers
People from Houston
1971 births